Herringthorpe Stadium is an athletics stadium in Rotherham, South Yorkshire, England. The stadium was opened in 1960 and was formerly a part of the Herringthorpe Leisure Complex, along with Herringthorpe Leisure Centre and several all-weather football pitches. The stadium contains a 400m, Olympic-class running track and a grass pitch, as well as facilities for all other Olympic disciplines such as discus nets. In addition, it is surrounded by the massive Playing Fields which provide pitches and training facilities for all manner of local sports and teams. The stadium was the area's premier athletics venues until the English Institute of Sport was opened in nearby Sheffield in 2004. Rotherham Harriers athletics club are based at the stadium, and since 2005, it has been the home ground of Rugby League Conference side Rotherham Giants. It has also hosted Rotherham Titans rugby union games. It also continues to host regular athletics meets and school competitions, as well as catering for a wide variety of other sports and events. The stadium was featured on Jamie Oliver's Jamie's Ministry of Food program as the venue for the final 'Pass It On!' conference.

When the Leisure Centre and all-weather pitches were demolished in 2009, the stadium was maintained and there have been plans to add a new 1000-capacity stand in the space that used to be occupied by the Leisure Centre.

Sources 
 http://www.runtrackdir.com/details.asp?track=rotherham
 http://www.rotherham.gov.uk/graphics/Leisure/Parks/EDSHerringthorpePlayingFields.htm
 https://web.archive.org/web/20110724081415/http://v4.sportnetwork.net/phorum/read.php?416,3830927,3830927
 https://web.archive.org/web/20090505161534/http://www.rotherhamhealth.nhs.uk/rotherham/Directory/OrgDetails.asp?RecordID=453

Athletics (track and field) venues in England
Sports venues in Rotherham